Nathan de Medina (born 8 October 1997) is a Belgian professional footballer who plays as a defender for 2. Bundesliga club Eintracht Braunschweig.

Club career
De Medina joined Anderlecht in 2004. He made his first team debut on 19 May 2016 in a 5–2 away loss to Genk playing the entire match.

De Medina signed with Bundesliga newcomers Arminia Bielefeld on a free transfer from Royal Excel Mouscron in July 2020, having agreed a three-year contract. He was sent off for a reckless challenge on Niclas Füllkrug in a 2–0 loss to Werder Bremen in March 2021.

Personal life
De Medina was born in Belgium and is of Cape Verdean descent.

References

External links
 
 
 

1997 births
Living people
People from Mouscron
Belgian people of Cape Verdean descent
Belgian footballers
Footballers from Hainaut (province)
Association football defenders
Belgium under-21 international footballers
Belgium youth international footballers
Belgian Pro League players
Challenger Pro League players
Bundesliga players
2. Bundesliga players
R.S.C. Anderlecht players
Oud-Heverlee Leuven players
Royal Excel Mouscron players
Arminia Bielefeld players
Eintracht Braunschweig players
Belgian expatriate footballers
Belgian expatriate sportspeople in Germany
Expatriate footballers in Germany